David Dunbar may refer to:

David Dunbar, of the Hope-Dunbar baronets
David Dunbar (actor) (1886–1953), Australian film actor
David Dunbar (colonel), 18th century surveyor of king's woods in North America, and Lt. Gov. of New Hampshire
David Dunbar Buick (1854–1929), Scottish-born American inventor, best known for founding the Buick Motor Company
David Dunbar-Nasmith (1921–1997), Royal Navy officer

See also
Dunbar (disambiguation)